Peace Country Health Region was the governing body for healthcare regulation in an area of the Canadian province of Alberta until 2008 when the regional health authorities were merged into the province-wide Alberta Health Services.  The area region included the communities of:
 Beaverlodge
 Rycroft
 Spirit River
 Saddle Hills County
 Fairview
 Hines Creek
 Fox Creek
 Grande Cache
 Grande Prairie
 Grimshaw
 Berwyn
 High Prairie
 Hythe
 Manning
 Nampa
 Northern Sunrise County
 Peace River
 Sexsmith
 Buffalo Lake
 Teepee Creek
 Donnelly
 Falher
 Girouxville

External links
 Peace Country Health Region website

Health regions of Alberta
Peace River Country